Gjadër is a settlement in the Lezhë County, northwestern Albania. At the 2015 local government reform it became part of the municipality of Lezhë. It is known for the former military air base made famous during the Cold War.

History 
According to Report of a Visit to Parts of Turkey, Bar, Albania and Serbia (written by Marin Bici, Archbishop of Antivari) Gjadër, at the time, was a village of about eighty houses, the vast majority of which were inhabited by Roman Catholics, while two or three houses were inhabited by Muslims. According to the 1890 register of the Roman Catholic Diocese of Sapë Gjadër at that time had a population of 438 people consisting of 388 Catholics and 50 Muslims.

Notable people
Gjon Gazulli, ambassador of Skanderbeg

References

Populated places in Lezhë
Villages in Lezhë County